Isodemis stenotera is a moth of the family Tortricidae. It is known from China (Hunan, Guangxi, Hainan, Tibet, Yunnan) and Indonesia (Sumatra).

The wingspan is 17.5–22 mm for males and 19–27 mm for females. The head, antenna and labial palpus are yellow, scattered with ochreous. The thorax and tegula are ochreous brown tinged with yellow. The forewing is broad, nearly rectangular and the apex is slightly protruding anteriorly. The ground color is yellow, with scattered pale ochreous scales medially, densely covered with ochreous brown scales along the dorsal area. The markings are ochreous brown with sparse brownish black scales: the costal margin with two dots near the base and a triangular spot. The median fascia are interrupted or indistinct medially. There is a faint pale ochreous yellow stripe running from below the costal portion of the median fascia to the termen below the apex, gradually narrowing. There is a subapical blotch running from the middle of the costal margin to before the apex. It is narrowly stripe-shaped, with
brownish black and yellow dots along the costal margin. The cilia are ochreous mixed with brownish black, but yellow at the apex. The hindwings are pale grayish brown, distally with a large yellow patch tinged with sparse pale ochreous brown scales. The cilia is pale grayish brown. The legs are pale yellow, mixed with brownish black on the ventral side of the foreleg. The outer side of the mid- and hindlegs is yellow, tinged with brownish black. The abdomen is grayish brown.

This species is very similar to the type species Isodemis serpentinana both in appearance and in the genitalia, but can be distinguished by the male and female genitalia.

External links

Review of the genus Isodemis Diakonoff (Lepidoptera, Tortricidae) from China, with description of three new species

Archipini